Rissoina cylindrica is a species of minute sea snail, a marine gastropod mollusk or micromollusk in the family Rissoinidae.

Description
The height of the shell attains 10.5 mm

Distribution
This species occurs in the Indian Ocean off Madagascar.

References

 Bozzetti L. (2009). Rissoina (Moerchiella) cylindrica sp. nov. (Gastropoda: Hypsogastropoda: Rissoidae: Rissoininae) dal Madagascar meridionale. Malacologia Mostra Mondiale 62: 11-12

External links
 Gastropods.com: Rissoina (Moerchiella) cylindrica

Rissoinidae